Regina Becker-Schmidt  is an emeritus professor at the Institute of Sociology and Social Psychology at the Leibniz University Hannover. Her research focuses on corporate and subject theory, critical theory, psychoanalytically oriented social psychology and gender studies.  She is considered a seminal figure in feminist critical theory.

Work
Starting in 1957, Becker-Schmidt studied sociology, philosophy, economics and social psychology at the Goethe University Frankfurt and at the Sorbonne in Paris. From 1964 to 1972 she worked as a research assistant and from 1968 as an assistant professor at the Institute for Social Research  in Frankfurt am Main, where she taught as a lecturer at the Social Sciences Faculty of the University. In 1973 she was appointed to a professorship at Leibniz University Hannover at the Psychological Institute, the post she held until her retirement in 2002.

In particular, Becker-Schmidt influenced the development of feminist critical theory, especially in the German-speaking countries. Her approach is associated with the so-called Hannoverian approach in feminist-oriented sociology and has had decisive influence on the approach.

She critiqued the positions of critical theory, especially Adorno and Horkheimer, with regard to their ambivalent attitude to the complex of gender relations and how the critical theorists have been oblivious to feminism. She questioned how gender relations could be made an integral part of critical theory. Muharrem Acikgöz situates Regina Becker-Schmidt in the second generation of the Frankfurt School; she was a student of Adorno's. She distinguishes herself from other feminist critical theorists in her empirical orientation, following Max Horkheimer, who argued that "larger philosophical questions" guide empirical research; and empirical research, in turn, guides larger philosophical questions. Her research on female factory workers situates itself in this relation.

Becker-Schmidt conducted empirical research on female factory workers, developing her own social theory based on her findings. Her first project was entitled "Problems of Mothers who are Wage Laborers", and consisted of interviews with sixty factory workers, half who were still working and half who had withdrawn from factory work. Her research shed tight on the "double burden" faced by women factory workers: the responsibility for domestic work combined with the responsibility for contributing to the income of the family. She developed the concept of double socialization of women through wage labour and domestic work: the two spheres come from two different social realms with different logics, and are both separated and connected. Her research focused on both the objective demands of work, and the subjective realities of the worker. In each setting, time itself functions differently: in the factory, women must not lose time; while when taking care of children, women must forget about time, other than in remembering to get housework done before work the next day. The two realms are recombined through relationships (assumed to be heterosexual) and in the efforts of women to "have both" career and family life.

References

Year of birth missing (living people)
Living people
20th-century German philosophers
German sociologists
Marxist theorists
Continental philosophers
Critical theorists
Social philosophers
Frankfurt School
German women sociologists
German feminists
Goethe University Frankfurt alumni
Academic staff of the University of Hanover